Edward Lester may refer to:

 Ted Lester (1923–2015), English cricketer for Yorkshire
 Edward Lester (Middlesex cricketer), English cricketer active 1929–31